Pennsylvania Hospital is a private, non-profit, 515-bed teaching hospital located in Center City Philadelphia and is part of the University of Pennsylvania Health System. Founded on May 11, 1751, by Benjamin Franklin and Dr. Thomas Bond, Pennsylvania Hospital is one of the earliest established public hospitals in the United States. It is also home to America's first surgical amphitheatre and its first medical library. The hospital's main building, dating to 1756, is a National Historic Landmark.

History
Pennsylvania Hospital was originally conceived in 1751 by Dr. Thomas Bond as an institution "for the reception and cure of the sick poor...free of charge. It was funded by "matching grant" to donations of the people of Philadelphia by a Bill which the House passed unanimously on 7 February 1750. Franklin went on to later write: "I do not remember any of my political Manoeuvres, the Success of which gave me at the time more Pleasure." On September 2, 1751, Mathias Koplin donated the first plot of ground for the new hospital. The first (temporary) building was opened on February 6, 1752, on High Street (now Market Street). Elizabeth Gardner, a Quaker widow, was appointed Matron of the hospital. As the hospital received support of the leading families in Philadelphia, its permanence was secured, and Samuel Rhoads was appointed architect of the new building.

Thomas Stretch was among the leading citizens of Philadelphia and one of the founders of Pennsylvania Hospital. He was a member of the Union Fire Company, also known as Benjamin Franklin's Bucket Brigade and a founder of the social club known as Schuylkill Fishing Company, and the club's first governor in 1732, re-elected annually until his death in 1765. Stretch was a director of the Philadelphia Contributionship (Hand-in-Hand fire mark) from 1758 to 1761.

In the Pennsylvania Gazette of May 29, 1755, Thomas Stretch appears as one of the largest subscribers (with Benjamin Franklin and others) to the fund for the Pennsylvania Hospital. The Stretch family and Benjamin Franklin each provided half of the original capital to fund the hospital. The list of subscribers reads:

Thomas Stretch and Joseph Stretch were sons of Peter Stretch (1670–1746) and Margery Hall Stretch (1668–1746). It is likely the reference to Isaac Stretch is to Isaac Stretch (1714–1770), son of Daniel Stretch (1694–1746), another son of Peter and Margery Stretch. The Stretch family were Quakers.

Joseph Stretch, mentioned above, was at this time "His Majesty's Collector of Excise for the City and County of Philadelphia", as may be seen from a notice in the Pennsylvania Gazette of October 28, 1756; and subsequently, in 1768, he was "His Majesty’s Collector of Customs, etc., for the Port of Philadelphia". Robert Harding was pastor of St. Joseph's Church.

In 1755, the cornerstone was laid for the East Wing of what would become the hospital's permanent location at 8th and Pine Streets. All of the patients were transferred from the temporary hospital to the permanent hospital on December 17, 1756. The first admission of a new patient occurred on the following day. The site continued to grow through the years with the addition of more wings (such as the West Wing of the building which was built in 1796) and buildings, extra land, and further expansion.

While attending clinics in the Pennsylvania Hospital in November 1869, the first time women students attended the hospital, Anna Lukens and a Miss Brumall led a line of women students out of the hospital grounds amid hisses, jeers, insults, and thrown stones and mud from male students.

Pennsylvania Hospital gained a reputation as a center of innovation and medical advancement, particularly in the area of maternity. It was a teaching hospital from its very beginning, when Bond would lead rounds through what is now the east wing of the main building. In its early years it was also known for its particularly advanced and humane facilities for mentally ill patients (at a time when mental illness was very poorly understood and patients were often treated very badly). Care of the mentally ill was removed to West Philadelphia in 1841 with the construction of the Pennsylvania Hospital for the Insane, later known as The Institute of the Pennsylvania Hospital. Under superintendent Thomas Story Kirkbride, the hospital developed a treatment philosophy that became the standard for care of the mentally ill in the 19th century.

In 1950, Pennsylvania Hospital was recognized for becoming more highly specialized as it established, in addition to its sophisticated maternity programs, an intensive care unit for neurological patients, a coronary care unit, an orthopaedic institute, a diabetes center, a hospice, specialized units in oncology and urology and broadened surgical programs.

The hospital has served as a center for treating the war wounded. Patients were brought to the hospital for treatment in the Revolutionary War, the American Civil War and the Spanish–American War, and units from the hospital were sent abroad to treat wounded in World War I and in World War II (to the Pacific theater).

The seal of the hospital, chosen by Franklin and Bond, incorporates the story of the Good Samaritan; the phrase "Take Care of Him and I will repay Thee" is used on it.

In 1997, Pennsylvania Hospital's Board of Managers made the decision to merge with the University of Pennsylvania Health System. The large health system helps to support the formerly stand-alone hospital with its network of resources.

In 2001, Pennsylvania Hospital celebrated its 250th anniversary.

Historic firsts

Historic library
In 1762, the first book for the hospital's medical library was donated by John Fothergill, a British friend of Franklin's. In 1847, the American Medical Association designated the library as the first, largest, and most important medical library in the United States. That year, in 1847, the library contained about 9,000 volumes. The collection now contains over 13,000 volumes dating back to the 15th century—including medical and scientific volumes as well as books on natural history. The library includes the nation's most complete collection of medical books published between 1750 and 1850. The collection also contains several incunabula, books written before 1501, when the printed process was invented.

Surgical amphitheater

The top floor of Pennsylvania Hospital is the home of the nation's oldest surgical amphitheater, which served as the operating room from 1804 through 1868. Surgeries were performed on sunny days between 11:00 am and 2:00 pm since there was no electricity at the time. The surgical amphitheater seats 180 and with those standing, up to 300 people might be present during any given surgical operation.

Physic garden
The Board of Managers first proposed the Physic Garden in 1774 to provide physicians with ingredients for medicines. The idea was approved, but financial circumstances intervened and the project was delayed for two centuries. In 1976, the planting of the garden was the bicentennial project of the Philadelphia Committee of the Garden Club of America and the Friends of Pennsylvania Hospital. Located in front of the Pine Building's West Wing, the garden has plants that were once used for medicines to stimulate the heart, ease toothaches, relieve indigestion, and cleanse wounds in the 18th century.

Maternity firsts
Pennsylvania Hospital is noted for its many firsts in the area of women's medicine, especially in maternity. In 1803, the hospital established a "lying-in" (or maternity) department.  This lasted until 1854 when obstetrics and gynecology took a 75-year break at the hospital. The specialties were reinstated in 1929 with the opening of the Woman's Building (now the Spruce Building) which sported 150 adult beds, 80 bassinets, 2 operating rooms, a series of labor and delivery rooms, and outpatient clinics. It was considered "one of the most modern hospital buildings in the country" especially at a time when women's medicine was not thought to be very important and most births were still done at home. This was followed in 1978 with the first Antenatal Testing Unit (ATU) in the region and in 1985 when the first GIFT (Gamete IntraFallopian Transfer) pregnancy in Philadelphia was achieved at the hospital. In 1987, Pennsylvania Hospital achieved two obstetrical firsts: the first birthing suite in a tertiary care hospital in the state was opened, and the first gestational carrier and egg donor programs in the Delaware Valley were begun to complement the hospital's existing fertility services. In 1995, the hospital was the first in the region to achieve 1,000 live births from in-vitro fertilization, GIFT, and other assisted reproductive technologies.

Notable physicians
 Benjamin Rush, on staff from 1783 until 1813, he was a medical teacher, a social reformer, and a signer of the Declaration of Independence.
 Philip Syng Physick, on staff from 1794 until 1816, he achieved fame through his surgical prowess.
 C. Everett Koop, intern in 1941, Surgeon General of the United States from 1982 to 1989. Dr. Koop completed residency training at Pennsylvania hospital.
 Andrew von Eschenbach, intern, 1963, a director at biotechnology company BioTime, served as the 20th United States FDA Commissioner.
 Patricia A. Ford, on staff since 1996, Director for the Center of Bloodless Medicine, performed the first bloodless stem cell transplant in 1995.

See also

 University of Pennsylvania Health System
 Hospital of the University of Pennsylvania ("HUP") – A separate hospital also affiliated with the Penn Health System.
 Penn Presbyterian Medical Center ("Presby")
 List of National Historic Landmarks in Philadelphia
 List of the oldest hospitals in the United States
 National Register of Historic Places listings in Center City, Philadelphia

Notes

References

Further reading
 Graham, Kristen A. A History of the Pennsylvania Hospital (The History Press, 2008)
 Morton, Thomas G. and Frank Woodbury. The History of the Pennsylvania Hospital, 1751-1895 (1897). online
 Tomes, Nancy. "‘Little World of Our Own’: The Pennsylvania Hospital Training School for Nurses, 1895–1907." Journal of the History of Medicine and Allied Sciences (1978) 33#4 pp: 507-530.
 Williams, William H. "The" Industrious Poor" and the Founding of the Pennsylvania Hospital." Pennsylvania Magazine of History and Biography (1973): 431–443. in JSTOR
 Williams, William H. America's First Hospital: The Pennsylvania Hospital, 1751-1841 (1976); 186pp; scholarly history

External links

 Pennsylvania Hospital, University of Pennsylvania Health System
 Bloodless Medicine & Surgery Center, Pennsylvania Hospital

Buildings and structures completed in 1756
Hospital buildings completed in the 18th century
Hospitals established in the 1750s
Teaching hospitals in Pennsylvania
Hospitals in Philadelphia
1752 establishments in Pennsylvania
Health System
National Historic Landmarks in Pennsylvania
American Civil War hospitals
Perelman School of Medicine at the University of Pennsylvania
Washington Square West, Philadelphia
National Register of Historic Places in Philadelphia